Enzo L'Acqua is an Italian painter and ceramist born in Savona in 1938. The gallery "El Temple" exhibited L'Acqua's together with Juan Segura's in 2007.

References 

20th-century Italian painters
20th-century Italian male artists
Italian male painters
21st-century Italian painters
Italian ceramists
Living people
1938 births
People from Savona
21st-century ceramists
21st-century Italian male artists